The 1979 Milan Indoor, also known by its sponsored name Ramazzotti Cup, was a men's tennis tournament played on indoor carpet courts at the Palazzo dello Sport in Milan, Italy. The event was part WCT Tour which was incorporated into the 1979 Colgate-Palmolive Grand Prix circuit. It was the second edition of the tournament and was held from 26 March through 1 April 1979. Third-seeded John McEnroe won the singles title.

Finals

Singles
 John McEnroe defeated  John Alexander 6–4, 6–3
 It was McEnroe's 2nd singles title of the year and the 7th of his career.

Doubles
 Peter Fleming /  John McEnroe defeated  José Luis Clerc /  Tomáš Šmíd 6–1, 6–3

References

External links
 ITF tournament edition details

Milan
Milan Indoor
Milan Indoor
Milan Indoor
Milan Indoor